The 2006 Prince Edward Island Scott Tournament of Hearts was held Jan. 19–22 in at the Maple Leaf Curling Club in O'Leary, Prince Edward Island. The winning team was Team Suzanne Gaudet who represented Prince Edward Island, finished with a 4-7 round-robin record at the 2006 Scott Tournament of Hearts in London, Ontario.

Teams

Draw 1
January 19, 7:00 PM AT

Draw 2
January 20, 10:00 AM AT

Draw 3
January 20, 3:00 PM AT

Draw 4
January 21, 10:00 AM AT

Draw 5
January 21, 3:00 PM AT

Playoffs

Semi-final
January 22, 1:00 PM AT

Final
January 22, 6:00 PM AT

References

Prince Edward Island Scott Tournament Of Hearts, 2006
2006 in Prince Edward Island
Curling competitions in Prince Edward Island